Paul J. Springer is an American author, professor, and military historian.  Born in Iowa in 1975, Springer attended Urbandale High School in Urbandale, Iowa and Texas A&M University, earning a BS in Psychology in 1997 and a PhD in Military History in 2006.  He is now a history professor at the Air Command and Staff College and has also taught at the United States Military Academy at West Point. He has appeared as a consultant and interview subject for programs on the History Channel, the Discovery Channel, and the National Geographic Channel. Springer was named a Senior Fellow of the Foreign Policy Research Institute in 2014.

He is the author of America's Captives: Treatment of POWs from the Revolutionary War to the War on Terror.

He is the author of Military Robots and Drones: A Reference Handbook, part of the Contemporary World Issues series examining the global approach to military robotics and artificial intelligence.

He is the co-author of Transforming Civil War Prisons: Lincoln, Lieber, and the Laws of War, with Glen Robins, a book analyzing the ways in which prisons of the American Civil War changed over the course of the conflict.

He is the author of Cyber Warfare: A Reference Handbook, part of the Contemporary World Issues series examining the global approach to conflict within the cyber domain.

He is the author of 9/11 and the War on Terror: A Documentary and Reference Guide, a collection of 100 primary-source documents relating to the War on Terror, with analysis of each.

He is the editor of Encyclopedia of Cyber Warfare, a work detailing the myriad elements of cyber warfare.

He is the author of Outsourcing War to Machines: The Military Robotics Revolution, an analysis of how the use of autonomous military vehicles is transforming the very nature of human conflict.

He is the co-author of Daily Life of U.S. Soldiers, a 3-volume series with Christopher R. Mortenson, examining the experiences of the U.S. Army in all of its wars.

He is the editor of Propaganda from the American Civil War, a collection of 100 examples of Civil War propaganda, with analysis of each.

He is the editor of Cyber Warfare: A Documentary and Reference Guide, a collection of 85 documents related to cyber warfare, with analysis of each.

He is the co-author of Sharing the Journey: A Military Spouse's Perspective, with Dawn A. Goldfein and Katelynne R. Baier.

References 

American military historians
1975 births
Living people
United States Military Academy faculty
American male non-fiction writers
Texas A&M University alumni
Historians from Texas
People from Urbandale, Iowa